Châteaudouble is the name of the following communes in France:

 Châteaudouble, Drôme, in the Drôme department
 Châteaudouble, Var, in the Var department